John Gallacher (born 12 December 1951) is a Scottish former footballer, who played for Queen's Park, Heart of Midlothian ("Hearts") and Dumbarton in the Scottish Football League. Gallacher was part of the Hearts team in the 1976 Scottish Cup Final, which they lost 3–1 to Rangers.

References

1951 births
Living people
Footballers from Falkirk
Scottish footballers
Association football central defenders
Queen's Park F.C. players
Heart of Midlothian F.C. players
Dumbarton F.C. players
Scottish Football League players